MTV Hungary was a Hungarian pay television channel.

History

A local MTV Hungary was launched on 1 October 2007, replacing MTV Europe. However, this was closed on December 1, 2013, with MTV Europe replacing MTV Hungary.

On October 3, 2017, it was relaunched with the Hungarian block of music videos airing between 9:00 and 21:00, and the remainder was being taken over by MTV Europe programming. All programming on the MTV Europe block became available in either Hungarian subtitles or dubbing.

From March 2020, for an unknown reason, the Hungarian programming block was controversially reduced to 4 hours between 17:00 to 21:00, then to 4 hours 15 minutes between 17:00 and 21:15.
 
On February 17, 2021, further changes were made to MTV available in Hungary. Instead of the localized version of MTV Europe with Hungarian subtitles/advertising, the channel broadcasts MTV Poland with localized advertising and subtitles. A Hungarian music block takes place between 17:00 and 21:00 featuring content from MTV Hits, Club MTV and MTV's chart shows.

The channel was rebranded between 14 September and 1 October 2021.

From 1 October 2021, the Hungarian programming block was got longer broadcast time. On Weekdays to 5 hours 25 minutes between 15:35 and 21:00. On Weekends to 5 hours 50 minutes between 15:10 and 21:00. 

On 31 March 2022, was shut down and replaced with MTV Europe.

Music shows

2007-2010: 

 Swung
 Alternative Nation
 Be My DJ
 MTV Blokk
 Top Selection
 Rock Chart
 Headbangers Ball
 Korai Dalömlés ( Morning Glory )

2010-2013: 

 Folyt.köv
 Top 10@10

2017-2020: 

 MTV Hits
 MTV 100% Music
 MTV Hot&Fresh
 MTV Throwback
 Hello Weekend
 MTV MUSIC BATTLE
 MTV Local Heroes
 MTV Girl Power
 MTV Pump It Up
 MTV Party Hard
 Monday Mixer
 MTV Chart Show
 Top 5
 Top 10
 brand:new
 Your Playlist
 Club MTV
 MTV Club Chart
 MTV Online Chart
 MTV Base Chart
 Local Chart
 CCC's Music Chart

2020-2021

 MTV Hits
 Club MTV
 Local Chart

2021-2022

 MTV Hits
 Club MTV
 Local Chart
 EMA TOP 10(October 2021 only)
 EMA TOP 20(October 2021 only)

Reality shows

 Engine Room
 MTV Cribs
 Teen Cribs
 Best Show Ever
 The Hills
 Disaster Date

 Jersey Shore
 The Hard Times of RJ Berger
 The Real World
 The City
 Baby High
 South Park

 Made
 Taking The Stage
 The Hills
 Jackass
 America's Best Dancecrew
 Valemont

 A Shot at Love
 MTV at the Movies
 From G's to Gents
 My life as Liz
 Paris Hilton's My New BFF

MTV trademark suit

Magyar Televízió, Hungary's public broadcaster who has a trademark on the initials MTV, registered with the Hungarian copyright office, sued the American MTV (Music Television) network for trademark infringement when the Hungarian version of the music channel was launched in 2007.  The suit is still ongoing.

Additional channels from MTV Networks Europe in Hungary
 Comedy Central
 Nickelodeon

References

External links 
 Official site
 MTV Networks Europe Site

2007 establishments in Hungary
2013 disestablishments in Hungary
2017 establishments in Hungary
2022 disestablishments in Hungary
MTV channels
Defunct television channels in Hungary
Music organisations based in Hungary
Television channels and stations established in 2007
Television channels and stations disestablished in 2013
Television channels and stations established in 2017
Television channels and stations disestablished in 2022